Guy Durell Dennis (born February 28, 1947) is an American former college and professional football player who was an offensive lineman in the National Football League (NFL) for seven seasons during the 1960s and 1970s.  Dennis played college football for the University of Florida, and received All-American honors.  Thereafter, he played professionally for the Cincinnati Bengals and the Detroit Lions of the NFL.

Early life 

Dennis was born in Walnut Hill, Florida in 1947, and he attended Ernest Ward High School in Walnut Hill.

College career 

Dennis received an athletic scholarship to attend the University of Florida in Gainesville, Florida, where he played guard for coach Ray Graves' Florida Gators football team from 1966 to 1968.  He was a first-team All-Southeastern Conference (SEC) selection in 1967 and 1968, a first-team All-American in 1968, and a team captain in 1968.  He was also the recipient of the Gators' Fergie Ferguson Award, recognizing the "senior football player who displays outstanding leadership, character and courage."

While he was an undergraduate, Dennis was initiated as a member of the Pi Kappa Alpha fraternity (Alpha Eta chapter).  He graduated from Florida with bachelor's degree in 1970, and was later inducted into the University of Florida Athletic Hall of Fame as a "Gator Great."

Professional career 

The Cincinnati Bengals selected Dennis in the fifth round (109th pick overall) of the 1969 NFL Draft.  He played professional football as a center, offensive guard and offensive tackle for four seasons for the Bengals (–) and three seasons for the Detroit Lions (–),  In his seven-year NFL career, Dennis played in 89 games with 13 starts. He was also traded to San Diego Chargers and played preseason before retiring.

See also 

 1968 College Football All-America Team
 Florida Gators football, 1960–69
 History of the Cincinnati Bengals
 List of Detroit Lions players
 List of Florida Gators football All-Americans
 List of Florida Gators in the NFL Draft
 List of Pi Kappa Alpha brothers
 List of University of Florida alumni
 List of University of Florida Athletic Hall of Fame members

References

Bibliography 
 Carlson, Norm, University of Florida Football Vault: The History of the Florida Gators, Whitman Publishing, LLC, Atlanta, Georgia (2007).  .
 Golenbock, Peter, Go Gators!  An Oral History of Florida's Pursuit of Gridiron Glory, Legends Publishing, LLC, St. Petersburg, Florida (2002).  .
 Hairston, Jack, Tales from the Gator Swamp: A Collection of the Greatest Gator Stories Ever Told, Sports Publishing, LLC, Champaign, Illinois (2002).  .
 McCarthy, Kevin M.,  Fightin' Gators: A History of University of Florida Football, Arcadia Publishing, Mount Pleasant, South Carolina (2000).  .
 McEwen, Tom, The Gators: A Story of Florida Football, The Strode Publishers, Huntsville, Alabama (1974).  .
 Nash, Noel, ed., The Gainesville Sun Presents The Greatest Moments in Florida Gators Football, Sports Publishing, Inc., Champaign, Illinois (1998).  .

1947 births
Living people
People from Escambia County, Florida
Players of American football from Florida
American football centers
American football offensive guards
Florida Gators football players
All-American college football players
Cincinnati Bengals players
Detroit Lions players
American Football League players